Badaun  Assembly constituency is  one of the 403 constituencies of the Uttar Pradesh Legislative Assembly,  India. It is a part of the Badaun district and one  of the five assembly constituencies in the Badaun Lok Sabha constituency. First election in this assembly constituency was held in 1957 after the "DPACO (1956)" (delimitation order) was passed in 1956. After the "Delimitation of Parliamentary and Assembly Constituencies Order" was passed in 2008, the constituency was assigned identification number 115.

Wards  / Areas
Extent  of Badaun Assembly constituency is KCs Binawar, Kunwargaon, Budaun MB &  Kunwargaon NP of Budaun Tehsil; PCs Wazirganj, Lahra Ladpur, Sursena, Kaser  Panauta, Bankota, Kallia Kazampur, Rota, Karkatpur, Gotha of 4-Satsai KC  & Wazirganj NP of Bisauli Tehsil.

Members of the Legislative Assembly

Election results

2022

2017
Seventeenth  Legislative Assembly of Uttar Pradesh

2012 
Sixteenth  Legislative Assembly of Uttar Pradesh

See also
Budaun district
Badaun Lok Sabha constituency
Sixteenth Legislative Assembly of Uttar Pradesh
Uttar Pradesh Legislative Assembly
Vidhan Bhawan

References

External links
 

Assembly constituencies of Uttar Pradesh
Budaun
Constituencies established in 1956